The Tucson Gunners are a defunct minor professional basketball team based in Tucson, Arizona.  They played in the Western Basketball Association and won the league's first and only championship Notable players included Al Smith, Gerald Henderson, and future coach Jim Boylan.

References

Basketball teams established in 1978
Sports clubs disestablished in 1979
Western Basketball Association